Józef Kut (1905–1942) was a Polish and Roman Catholic priest. He died in a Nazi concentration camp. He is one of the 108 Martyrs of World War II who were beatified by Pope John Paul II in 1999.

See also 
List of Nazi-German concentration camps
The Holocaust in Poland
World War II casualties of Poland

References

1905 births
1942 deaths
People from Gniezno
Clergy from Poznań
Polish people who died in Nazi concentration camps
108 Blessed Polish Martyrs